"Du bist mein" is a song by Swiss-Albanian rapper Loredana, German-Lebanese rapper Zuna and Dutch producer SRNO. It was released on 27 March 2020 through Groove Attack and Loredana.

Commercially, the song peaked at number one in Germany, where it became Loredana's fourth, as well as Zuna's and SRNO's first number one single.

Background
The song marks the second collaboration between Loredana and Zuna, after the latter had previously co-written the song "Angst". Zefi teased the song release on 23 March 2020 by posting a clip of the song. According to her, the hook was created while being in quarantine. The project sparked further speculation about both artists possibly dating.

Critical reception
Lukas Breit of Rap.de thought the song "impresses with its summery vibes" and "spreads a good mood during times of quarantine". The editors at Laut.de described the song as "simple, yet effective" while the "Dancehall-tinged beat provides an appropriate basis for Loredana's and Zuna's superficial lyrics".

Music video
The accompanying music video was released on 27 March 2020 and directed by the rappers themselves. The video was filmed at Loredana's home near Lake Lucerne while her and Zuna placed themselves in self-isolation due to the COVID-19 epidemic. It features shots of both rappers, as well as a compilation of TikTok users doing dance routines to the song. The video reached more than 1,9 million views in its first 19 hours.

Charts

See also
 List of number-one hits of 2020 (Germany)

References 

2020 singles
2020 songs
Loredana Zefi songs
German-language songs
Number-one singles in Germany
Songs written by Loredana Zefi